Zanjan may refer to:

 Zanjan Province, Iran
 Zanjan County, an area within Zanjan Province
 Zanjan, Iran, the capital of Zanjan County and Zanjan Province
 University of Zanjan, in the city of Zanjan
 Zanjan Airport, an airport serving Zanjan, Iran

See also
 Zanzan (disambiguation)
 Senjan, a city in Markazi Province, Iran